King for One Night is a 1950 West German historical comedy film directed by Paul May and starring Anton Walbrook, Willy Fritsch and Annelies Reinhold. It was made at the Bavaria Studios in Munich. The film's sets were designed by the art directors Heinrich Beisenherz and Bruno Monden.

Cast
 Anton Walbrook as Graf von Lerchenbach
 Willy Fritsch as König Ludwig I von Bayern
 Annelies Reinhold as Gräfin Franziska Rosenau
 Margarete Slezak as Karoline
 Elisabeth Flickenschildt as Wilma
 Gustav Waldau
 Karl Schopp
 Georg Vogelsang
 Dieter Suchsland
 Michl Lang
 Erich Fischer

References

Bibliography 
 Bock, Hans-Michael & Bergfelder, Tim. The Concise Cinegraph: Encyclopaedia of German Cinema. Berghahn Books, 2009.

External links 
 

1950 films
1950s historical comedy films
German historical comedy films
West German films
1950s German-language films
Films directed by Paul May
Films set in Bavaria
Films set in the 19th century
1950 comedy films
German black-and-white films
1950s German films
Films shot at Bavaria Studios